Eucatagma is a genus of moths of the family Plutellidae.

Species
Eucatagma amyrisella - Busck, 1900 

Plutellidae